is a Japanese television drama mini-series that aired on NHK from 14 November 2009 to 19 December 2009. It is based on the novel of the same name written and released in Japan by Aso Iku.

The TV show follow a female police officer who was recruited into the Tokyo Metropolitan Police's anti-terrorist black ops unit known "publicly" as the Fourth Foreign Affairs Section, created after the 9/11 events in the United States. Its purpose is to tackle espionage and terrorism cases happening in Japan.

The franchise consists of the novel, the TV series and the 2012 movie.

Plot
After the September 11, 2001 attacks on American soil, the Tokyo Metropolitan Police Department creates a secret anti-terrorist division within the Public Security Bureau in order to tackle crime, espionage and terrorism cases to preserve Japan's national security by doing black ops work to locate and apprehend spies and terrorist suspects.

The unit recruits a new officer named Hina Matsuzawa, who wishes to become a full-time detective. Leading the unit is Public Security veteran officer Keiji Sumimoto as the unit is tasked a mysterious terrorist freelancer known with the codename FISH and his cell operating in Tokyo.

Cast 
Fourth Foreign Affairs Section
Atsurō Watabe as Kenji Sumimoto
Takumi Kitamura  as Kenji Sumimoto (child)
Machiko Ono as Hina Matsuzawa
Reiko Kataoka as Ayane Igarashi
Toshiyuki Kitami as Ryoga Kanazawa
Kenichi Takito as Shuma Hisano
Kiyohiko Shibukawa as Takuya Morinaga
Hiroshi Yamamoto (actor) as Haruto Otomo

Others
Yuriko Ishida as Aiko Shimomura
Kimiko Yo as Kumi Muramatsu (Chief Cabinet Secretary)
Ryo Ishibashi as Shotaro Ariga (Chief of NPA Security bureau)
Kenichi Endō as Toshitaka Kurata (Officer of NPA, Chief officer of ZERO section)

References

External links
  

2009 Japanese television series debuts
2009 Japanese television series endings
NHK original programming
Thriller television series
Terrorism in television
Japanese drama television series
Television shows based on Japanese novels
Tokyo Metropolitan Police Department in fiction

ko:외사경찰
ja:外事警察#テレビドラマ